Don Browne (8 January 1892 – 15 November 1975) was a Barbadian cricketer. He played in eleven first-class matches for the Barbados cricket team from 1919 to 1927.

See also
 List of Barbadian representative cricketers

References

External links
 

1892 births
1975 deaths
Barbadian cricketers
Barbados cricketers
People from Christ Church, Barbados